Thymosin beta-15B is a protein that, in humans, is encoded by the TMSB15B gene. The protein is identical in aminoacid sequence to Thymosin beta-15A, product of the TMSB15A gene, although synthesis of the two proteins is independently regulated.

See also 
 Thymosins

References

Further reading